Focus Plays Focus is the first studio album by Dutch rock band Focus, released in September 1970 on Imperial Records. It is the only album recorded by the group's original line-up consisting of organist and vocalist Thijs van Leer, bassist Martin Dresden, drummer Hans Cleuver, and guitarist Jan Akkerman. It was renamed In and Out of Focus for the international re-release of the album from 1971 onwards which included their debut single "House of the King".

Musical style
AllMusic's Richie Unterberger called the album "a fair collection of progressive rock tunes without a clear focus" and noted prominent influences from folk rock, blues, and classical music, as well as "occasional jazzy shadings".

Track listing

Original release
Source:

1971 reissue
Source:

1971 UK issue (Polydor 2344 003)

Personnel
Credits adapted from the album's 1970 liner notes.

Focus
Thijs van Leer – vocals (tracks 2, 5, 6), flute, Hammond organ, piano, electric piano, mellotron, harpsichord, vibraphone 
Jan Akkerman – guitars, acoustic guitars 
Martin Dresden – bass guitar, trumpet (tracks 4, 5), vocals (tracks 2, 3, 6)
Hans Cleuver – drums, bongos, vocals (tracks 2, 5, 6)

Production
Hubert Terheggen – production
Jerry Boys – engineering

Charts

References

External links

1970 debut albums
Focus (band) albums
Imperial Records albums